Priscilla is the second studio album by French singer Priscilla Betti. It was released in December 2002 and was supported by the two hit singles "Regarde-moi (teste-moi, déteste-moi)" and  "Tchouk tchouk musik" which both reached the top ten in France.

On the French Albums Chart, although the album was unable to enter the top ten, it was charted for 45 weeks. It eventually achieved Gold status.

Track listing

Personnel
 Lyrics by Bertrand Châtenet
 Music by Philippe Osman
 Arrangement, programmation and all instruments by Philippe Osman
 Mixing by Bertrand Châtenet (all tracks), Jérôme Devoise (tracks 3,5) and V.Chevalot (track 10)
 Mastered by André Perriat at Top Master studio
 Vocals by Priscilla (all tracks), Annie Calvert (tracks 1,2,6,7,9), Philippe Osman (tracks 3,7-10)
 Produced by B.Châtenet, P.Osman and P.Debort
 Edited by Mache Prod
 Photo by Emmanuel Scorcelletti / GAMMA
 Graphic design by Barejo

Charts

Certifications

References

2003 albums
Priscilla Betti albums